Eddie from Ohio is an American folk band. 
Formed in 1991 in Northern Virginia, the band has achieved considerable local success, winning four Wammies (Washington, D.C. area music awards) and a nationwide following, all outside the purview of major record labels.

Members
 Julie Murphy Wells - vocals
 Robbie Schaefer - guitar, vocals
 Eddie Hartness - percussion, vocals
 Michael Clem - guitar, bass, harmonica, vocals

History
Name notwithstanding, the band is not from Ohio. All four band members are natives of Virginia, and the band has recorded many songs influenced by their deep Virginia roots. The band's name comes from a nickname given to Hartness by a college friend, who coined the nickname as a tribute to the lead singer of Firehose, Ed 'From Ohio' Crawford.

Childhood friends Robbie Schaefer and Michael Clem both attended Virginia's James Madison University, where they founded the Jellyfish Blues Band. It was at JMU that they met Eddie Hartness, a native of Arlington, Virginia.

Schaefer had stayed in contact with Julie Murphy (now Murphy Wells), whom he'd met while they'd attended rival high schools. One evening, when Clem and Wells added their voices to Schaefer's during a set in a solo gig, the idea for EFO was formed. The trio invited percussionist Hartness to join them, and, in 1991, the nascent folk group came into being.

Their early repertoire of covers (by such artists as The Byrds and Blues Traveler) was soon augmented by originals from songwriters Schaefer and Clem, and over time the band developed a distinctive folk sound, marrying two acoustic guitars with hand percussion and strong four-part harmonies.

The band saw relative success from the beginning. They launched their own Virginia Soul record label, began producing cassettes and CDs, and handled their own business and bookings. They soon landed themselves a Tuesday night residency at a local Northern Virginia bar, the Bad Habits Grille. After just six months, the venue went from no cover and small audiences to a $5 cover charge and a packed house every Tuesday.

With this gig as a springboard, the band's following grew. EFO's first three CDs drew the attention of booking agency Fleming and Associates. Under their auspices, the band embarked on longer, more ambitious tours.

In 1998, the Washington Area Music Association honored EFO with a Wammie as "Best Contemporary Folk Group." Later that year, EFO played their farewell gig at Bad Habits and began regularly touring beyond the Washington, DC, metro area. They built a following that covered both coasts and the American heartland, with performances from Berkeley, California, to New York City and frequent returns to the band's Virginia home that included sold-out performances at such venues as the Wolf Trap National Park for the Performing Arts.
 
In September 2005 vocalist Wells was diagnosed with breast cancer. The band subsequently reduced their tour schedule, and the members began to pursue other interests.

Wells is now a cancer survivor, active in cancer cure fundraising. Clem and Schaefer continue to sing and tour independently. Schaefer has a respected children's music show, "Robbie Schaefer's Stuck In a Real Tall Tree," on XM Satellite Radio, where he serves as Music Director for XM Kids, and in 2004 released his second solo album entitled "In the Flesh." In 2006, Clem released his first solo endeavor, "1st and 40," produced by bandmate Hartness. Hartness himself continues to play and tour with local bands such as Brother Shamus.

The band continues to perform, but on a limited basis, mostly in the DC area. You can also occasionally catch a sneak performance of EFO forerunner, the Jellyfish Blues Band.

Discography
All releases are on the band's own label, Virginia Soul Records.
 EFO Live at the Birchmere (cassette only), 1991
 A Juggler on His Blades, 1992
 Actually Not, 1993
 I Rode Fido Home, 1995
 Big Noise, 1997
 Portable EFO Show, 1998
 Looking Out the Fishbowl, 1999
 Quick, 2001
 9 Eleven Relief, 2001
 Three Rooms, 2003
 This Is Me, 2004

External links
 Band's official website
 Robbie Schaefer's website
 Robbie Schaefer's Children's Album website
 Michael Clem's website
 Brother Shamus: Eddie Hartness is also a member of this band
 Eddie From Ohio collection on the Internet Archive's live music archive

American folk musical groups
Musical groups from Virginia